The 142nd Indiana Infantry Regiment was an infantry regiment from Indiana that served in the Union Army between November 3, 1864, and July 14, 1865, during the American Civil War.

Service 
The regiment was recruited at Fort Wayne and organized at Indianapolis, Indiana, with a strength of 1,015 men and mustered in on November 3, 1864. It left Indiana for Nashville, Tennessee, on November 18 was assigned post duty there until July 1865. The regiment was attached to the 2nd Brigade, 4th Division, 20th Corps and was left behind when the Corps marched into Georgia with Major General Sherman's Army.

With the 2nd Brigade, the regiment was in reserve at the Battle of Nashville on December 15–16, 1864. It occupied the left of the inner line of defense from the Cumberland River to Fort Negley. After the battle, the regiment remained at Nashville until it was mustered out on July 14, 1865. During its service the regiment incurred sixty-four fatalities, another twenty-eight deserted and twenty-two men unaccounted for.

See also
 List of Indiana Civil War regiments

Notes

References

Bibliography 
 Dyer, Frederick H. (1959). A Compendium of the War of the Rebellion. New York and London. Thomas Yoseloff, Publisher. .
 Holloway, William R. (2004). Civil War Regiments From Indiana. eBookOnDisk.com Pensacola, Florida. .
 Terrell, W.H.H. (1867). The Report of the Adjutant General of the State of Indiana. Containing Rosters for the Years 1861–1865, Volume 7. Indianapolis, Indiana. Samuel M. Douglass, State Printer.

Units and formations of the Union Army from Indiana
1864 establishments in Indiana
Military units and formations established in 1864
Military units and formations disestablished in 1865
1865 disestablishments in Tennessee